Dunod is a given name. Notable people with the name include:

Dunod Fawr, 6th century Brythonic King somewhere in the North of Britain
Saint Dunod, late 6th/early 7th century Abbot of Bangor-on-Dee